Judge William E. Moody has served as the presiding judge of the 34th District Court in El Paso since 1986.

2010 Election

Judge Moody in October 2009 announced that he will seek the Democratic Party's nomination for the Texas Supreme Court. He intends to use a blimp to travel around the state and advertise his campaign.

2006 Election

Judge Moody was the Democratic nominee for Place Two on the Supreme Court of Texas in the November 2006 general election.  His opponent was the incumbent, Justice Don Willett. Judge Moody sought to become the first El Pasoan to be elected to statewide office in Texas as well as the only Democrat on the Court, whose current membership is all Republican. In his campaign, he walked across Texas, which drew extensive press coverage. Moody was defeated in the general election.

Endorsements

Moody received the endorsements of the following Texas newspapers:

  The Amarillo Globe-News
  The Austin American-Statesman
  The Austin Chronicle
  The Daily Texan
  The Dallas Morning News
  The El Paso Times
  The Fort Worth Star-Telegram
  The Houston Chronicle
  The Lufkin Daily News
  The San Antonio Express-News
  The Victoria Advocate
  The ''Waco Tribune-Herald"
  In addition, Judge Moody was the favored candidate of Texas lawyers in a non-partisan poll conducted by the Texas State Bar.

References

Year of birth missing (living people)
Living people
People from El Paso, Texas
Texas Democrats
Texas state court judges